Rhopalophora prorubra is a species of beetle in the family Cerambycidae. It was described by Knull in 1944.

References

prorubra
Beetles described in 1944